The Man from Cairo is a 1953 British/Italian/American international coproduction film noir starring George Raft, who plays a man who is mistaken for a detective and sent to find lost World War II gold in Algiers, despite the film's title.

The film was Raft's last with top billing and the last of three films that he made for Lippert Pictures. It was also the final feature film of director Ray Enright and the American film debut of Irene Papas.

Plot
The French government investigates the location of some bullion stolen during the war.

Tourist Mike Canelli, an ex-serviceman who served in Algeria during the war, is mistaken for an American agent assisting the French.

Cast
George Raft as Mike Canelli
Gianna Maria Canale as Lorraine Belogne
Massimo Serato as Basil Constantine
Guido Celano as Sgt. Emile Touchard
Irene Papas as Yvonne Le Beaux
Alfredo Varelli as General Dumont, also known as Professor Crespi
Leon Lenoir as Capt. Akhim Bey
Mino Doro as Major Le Blanc, assumed name of Emile Moreau
Angelo Dessy as Pockmark

Production
The film was produced by Bernard Luber, who had just made Loan Shark with Raft. It was shot on location in Algeria and Italy and was made for $155,000, with $80,000 in deferrals.

Reception
In a contemporary review for The New York Times, critic Howard Thompson found the film to be formulaic but with "a sleazy, authentic-looking backdrop." Thompson wrote: "Lethargically directed by Ray H. Enright, the action soon levels off to a dull, unsurprising trot. ... Mr. Raft is Mr. Raft, still the same competent, brisk and unimaginative performer. ... [T]he rest go through their assigned motions. It takes all of them a long time."

References

External links

The Man from Cairo at TCMDB
Review of film at New York Times

1953 films
1950s English-language films
English-language Italian films
1953 crime films
British black-and-white films
Film noir
Films shot in Algeria
Films directed by Ray Enright
British crime films
Italian crime films
American black-and-white films
Italian black-and-white films
American crime films
1950s American films
1950s British films
1950s Italian films